The 2014–15 Stony Brook Seawolves men's basketball team represented Stony Brook University in the 2014–15 NCAA Division I men's basketball season. They were coached by tenth year head coach Steve Pikiell and played their home games at Island Federal Credit Union Arena. They were members of the America East Conference. They finished the season 23–12, 12–4 in America East play to finish in a tie for second place. They advanced to the championship game of the American East tournament where they lost to Albany. They were invited to the College Basketball Invitational where they lost in the first round to Mercer.

Roster

Schedule

|-
!colspan=9 style="background:#; color:white;"| Non-conference regular season

|-
!colspan=9 style="background:#; color:white;"| America East regular season

|-
!colspan=9 style="background:#; color:white;"| America East tournament

|-
!colspan=9 style="background:#; color:white;"|College Basketball Invitational

References

Stony Brook Seawolves men's basketball seasons
Stony Brook
Stony Brook
Stony Brook
Stony Brook